John Spilsbury may refer to:

John Spilsbury (Baptist minister), leader of the Particular Baptists in 17th-century England
John Spilsbury (cartographer), London mapmaker and engraver who invented the jigsaw puzzle
John Spilsbury (cricketer), English cricketer